Squadron Leader Percy Alec MacKenzie DSO, DFC (5 October 1918 – 1 January 1989) was an English first-class cricketer. MacKenzie was a right-handed batsman who bowled leg break googly. Later during the Second World War he became a decorated airman.

Pre-war
MacKenzie was educated at the Cathedral Choir School, Canterbury. While at the school, MacKenzie was coached by Felicity Hardcastle, a member of the Kent ladies' cricket team. MacKenzie was later taken onto the Kent County Cricket Club groundstaff on the recommendation of Charles Marriott, who had seen him bowling on the St Lawrence Ground with a tennis ball. After the 1935 season, MacKenzie was not retained by Kent.

MacKenzie made his first-class debut for Hampshire in the 1938 County Championship against Worcestershire at May's Bounty. MacKenzie played 22 first-class matches for Hampshire between 1938 and 1939, with his final match for Hampshire coming in the 1939 County Championship against Yorkshire at Dean Park Cricket Ground in Bournemouth. In MacKenzie's 22 first-class matches for the county he scored 652 runs at a batting average of 19.75, with four half centuries and a high score of 76 against Lancashire in 1939. With the ball, MacKenzie took 17 wickets at a bowling average of 35.58, with best figures of 4/34. In the field Ward took 11 catches.

Second World War service
With the onset of the Second World War, MacKenzie fought with the Royal Air Force Volunteer Reserve, where by 1943 he was a twice decorated squadron leader. Mackenzie became the first professional cricketer to be awarded the Distinguished Service Order (those cricketers awarded the DSO in prior conflicts were regarded as amateurs). Additionally in 1942, MacKenzie was awarded the Distinguished Flying Cross.

The London Gazette dated 26 May 1942 said of MacKenzie:

"Pilot Officer Mackenzie, who is in the RAFVR, has completed many sorties first as a navigator and later as group captain against heavily defended targets which have included Hamburg, Kiel and Essen. On all occasions, often in very bad weather with intense enemy opposition, by his determined efforts and skilful airmanship he has located and bombed all his targets successfully."

MacKenzie was awarded his DSO in 1943 for successfully bringing back a damaged Lancaster bomber following a raid over Berlin. The London Gazette dated 23 February 1943 reported:
Since being awarded the DFC, Acting Flight Lieutenant Mackenzie has participated in numerous successful sorties. One night in Jan 1943 he piloted an aircraft detailed to attack Berlin. Whilst crossing the coast on his homeward flight his aircraft was subjected to heavy and accurate anti-aircraft fire. Two of his aircraft's engines were damaged and rendered unserviceable. Height was lost but, although faced with a 300-mile flight over the sea, Flight Lieutenant Mackenzie continued his homeward journey. When halfway across the water a third engine became overheated. The aircraft was now down to 600 feet and the situation appeared hopeless, but Flight Lieutenant Mackenzie, displaying grim determination, flew on at this height and eventually reached this country where he landed his damaged aircraft. By his high courage and superb skill, this officer was undoubtedly responsible for the safe return of his aircraft and its crew.

Shortly afterward, MacKenzie was promoted to squadron leader and then later in the war moved to training duties.

Post-war
After the conclusion of the war, MacKenzie did not return to Hampshire and instead began flying civilian aircraft. He did not end his playing career though, turning out for Berkshire, making his debut for the county against Suffolk in the 1947 Minor Counties Championship. MacKenzie played ten Minor Counties matches for Berkshire, with his final appearance for the county coming against Hertfordshire in the 1948 Minor Counties Championship.

MacKenzie later represented the Kent Second XI in 1952 against Wiltshire.

MacKenzie died at Rye, Sussex on 1 January 1989.

References

External links

1918 births
1989 deaths
Sportspeople from Canterbury
English cricketers
Hampshire cricketers
Berkshire cricketers
Royal Air Force Volunteer Reserve personnel of World War II
Royal Air Force pilots of World War II
British World War II bomber pilots
Royal Air Force officers
Recipients of the Distinguished Flying Cross (United Kingdom)
Companions of the Distinguished Service Order
American flight instructors